The Miss Perú 1996 pageant was held on April 12, 1996. That year, 25 candidates were competing for the national crown. The chosen winner represented Peru at the Miss Universe 1996. The rest of the finalists would enter in different pageants.

Placements

Special Awards

 Best Regional Costume - Amazonas - Rochi Rubio
 Miss Photogenic - Madre de Dios - Vanessa Saba
 Miss Elegance - Ancash - Fiorella Faré
 Miss Body - Amazonas - Rochi Rubio
 Best Hair - Ayacucho - Geraldine Salmón
 Miss Congeniality - San Martín - Tatiana Vidaurre
 Most Beautiful Face - Madre de Dios - Vanessa Saba

.

Delegates

Amazonas - Rochi Rubio
Áncash - Fiorella Faré
Apurímac - Fiorella Woll
Arequipa - Tania Cassos
Ayacucho - Geraldine Salmon
Cajamarca - Sofía Durand
Callao - Gilda Raymondi
Cuzco - Ma. Eugenia Chávez
Distrito Capital - Leonor Escudero
Huancavelica - Claudia García
Huánuco - Elizabeth Yep 
Ica - Mariel Ocampo
Junín - Pamela Ugarte

La Libertad - Natali Sacco
Lambayeque - Giselle Avalos
Loreto - Pamela Lewis
Madre de Dios - Vanessa Saba
Moquegua - Roxana León
Pasco - Silvina Corbitz
Piura - Cecilia Martínez de Pinillos 
Puno - Cynthia Costa 
San Martín - Tatiana Vidaurre
Tacna - Colleen Ordoñez
Tumbes - Antoinette Coronado
Ucayali - Erika Lodwic

.

Miss World Peru

The Miss World Peru 1996 pageant was held on March 31, 1996, That year, 54 candidates from different districts, cities and regions of Peru and the private clubs and Peruvian associations overseas were competing for the national crown. The first cut to a Top 24 was chosen on March 17, in a previous show host by Antonio Vodanovic and Jessica Newton, both events were a live broadcast by ATV.  The chosen winner represented Peru at Miss World 1996. The rest of the finalists would enter in different pageants.

Placements

MWP Special Awards

 Miss Photogenic - Iquitos -  Mónica Chacón D’Vettori
 Miss Fitness - Iquitos -  Mónica Chacón D’Vettori
 Miss Elegance - Puerto de Ilo - Jennifer Fon
 Miss Congeniality - Huaraz - Katicsa Kovacs
 Miss Body - Pisco - Silvia Rodriguez
 Most Beautiful Face - San Martín - Fairus Barraza

MWP Delegates

Amazonas - Sandra salazar
Áncash - Claudia Barbi
Apurímac - Patricia Alarcon
Ayacucho - Yvette Ojeda
Callao - Julissa Gonzales
Chiclayo - Susana Paredes Cueva
Cuzco - Jenny Palacios Tapia
Huancayo - Regina Vurbal 
Huaraz - Katicsa Kovacs
Ica - Rosa Maria Guadalupe Lara
Iquitos - Mónica Chacón D’Vettori
Lambayeque - Giuliana Leguia

Loreto - Helly Calvo-Zegarra
Machu Picchu - Urzula Zevallos
Madre de Dios - Renata Troiano
Manu - Ericka Ramirez
Pasco - Susana Maruy
Pisco - Silvia Rodriguez
Pucallpa - Ana Lucia Melendez
Puerto de Ilo - Jennifer Fon
Region Lima - Guiliana Armas
San Martín - Fairus Barraza
Tingo María - Mirela Astolfi
Trujillo - Paola Aris

MWP Judges

 Gustavo Rubio - Representative of the Miss World Org.
 Jackeline Aguilera - Miss World 1995
 Carlos Morales - Public Relations Manager of Grupo D' elite
 Osmel Sousa - President of the Miss Venezuela Org.
 Acirema Alayeto - President of the Miss Latin America Org.
 Moon Hym Kim - Representative of Daewoo Motors
 Raul Romero - Peruvian Singer & TV Host
 Nuria Piug - Mrs. Peru 1995
 Leandro Chiok Chang - Executive President of Americana de Aviacion
 María Elena Bellido - Miss Latin America 1991
 Dr. Max Álvarez - Plastic Surgeon

MWP Special Guests Singers

 Paco de Lucía - "Fina Estampa"
 Cecilia Bracamonte - "La Veguera"
 Braulio - "En Bancarrota" & "Si Me Quieres Matar"

.

References 

Miss Peru
1996 in Peru
1996 beauty pageants